Christian Balagasay (born October 28, 1996) is a Filipino professional basketball player for the NorthPort Batang Pier of the Philippine Basketball Association (PBA).

PBA career statistics

As of the end of 2022–23 season

Season-by-season averages

|-
| align=left | 
| align=left | Terrafirma
| 11 || 10.7 || .286 || .000 || .000 || 1.6 || .4 || .2 || .1 || 1.1
|-
| align=left | 
| align=left | Terrafirma
| 6 || 4.0 || .333 || .333 || – || .3 || .0 || .2 || .0 || .8
|-
| align=left rowspan=2| 
| align=left | Terrafirma
| rowspan=2|28 || rowspan=2|7.9 || rowspan=2|.302 || rowspan=2|.214 || rowspan=2|.833 || rowspan=2|1.4 || rowspan=2|.1 || rowspan=2|.0 || rowspan=2|.1 || rowspan=2|1.4
|-
| align=left | NorthPort
|-class=sortbottom
| align="center" colspan=2 | Career
| 45 || 8.1 || .300 || .222 || .714 || 1.3 || .2 || .1 || .1 || 1.2

References

External links
PBA.ph profile

1996 births
Living people
Basketball players from Bataan
Centers (basketball)
Filipino men's basketball players
Letran Knights basketball players
NorthPort Batang Pier players
Power forwards (basketball)
Terrafirma Dyip draft picks
Terrafirma Dyip players